Cockburn Ice Arena is an ice sports and ice skating centre, located in the Bibra Lake suburb of the City of Cockburn, Perth. It hosts a number of ice hockey and curling games, including Perth Inferno and IHWA Premiere League games. The venue offers a wide variety of activities including ice skating lessons, birthday parties, and public skating sessions.

See also

List of ice rinks in Australia
Australian Women's Ice Hockey League

References

External links
 

Figure skating venues in Australia
Ice hockey venues in Australia
Speed skating venues in Australia
Indoor arenas in Australia
City of Cockburn